EKR may refer to:

East Kent Railways (disambiguation), various railways in Kent, England 
EKR (missile), 1950s Soviet cruise missile
Edward Kennard Rand, an American professor and medievalist known to his peers as EKR
East Kazakhstan Region, a division of Kazakhstan 
Erdős–Ko–Rado theorem in combinatorics
 East of the Kennebec River; see Historical United States Census totals for Piscataquis County, Maine, United States 
Elisabeth Kübler-Ross (1926–2004), psychiatrist, and writer/lecturer on death studies 
E.K.R., Swiss rapper
Yace language of Nigeria (ISO code: ekr) 
Railway station for Ekangarsarai, Bihar, India (station code: EKR)